Okay Yokuşlu (born 9 March 1994) is a Turkish professional footballer who plays as a midfielder for West Bromwich Albion and the Turkey national team.

Club career
On 27 June 2011, at the age of 17, he signed for Kayserispor for a record transfer fee for Altay of TRY 2.3 million (€1 million). He made his Süper Lig debut in the starting line-up in which Kayserispor were beaten by Antalyaspor with 1–0 final score, on 16 September 2011.

On 1 February 2021, Yokuşlu joined English club West Bromwich Albion on loan from RC Celta de Vigo, for the remainder of the 2020–21 season. Six days later, he made his debut for Albion as a substitute for Romaine Sawyers in a 0–2 away league defeat by Tottenham Hotspur.

On 26 January 2022, Yokuşlu moved to fellow La Liga side Getafe CF on loan until June.

On 18 July 2022, Yokuşlu returned to now EFL Championship club West Bromwich Albion on a three-year contract following his departure from Celta Vigo. He scored his first goal for the club on 1 November 2022 in a 1-0 win against Blackpool.

International career
Okay was selected for Turkey's U-20 squad for the 2013 FIFA U-20 World Cup. He scored "a beautifully judged chip over the stranded [goalkeeper] from " to complete the hosts' 2–1 defeat of Australia and progression to the last 16 of the competition. On 6 November 2015, Yokuşlu was selected for the Turkey national football team to play friendlies against Qatar and Greece respectively. He made his debut as a late sub against Greece in a 0–0 tie.

Career statistics

Club

International

International goals
Scores and results list Turkey's goal tally first, score column indicates score after each Yokuşlu goal.

References

External links

 
 
 
 Profile at Eurosport

1994 births
Living people
People from Konak
Footballers from İzmir
Turkish footballers
Turkey international footballers
Turkey under-21 international footballers
Turkey youth international footballers
Association football midfielders
Süper Lig players
TFF First League players
La Liga players
Karşıyaka S.K. footballers
Altay S.K. footballers
Kayserispor footballers
Trabzonspor footballers
RC Celta de Vigo players
West Bromwich Albion F.C. players
Getafe CF footballers
Turkish expatriate footballers
Expatriate footballers in Spain
UEFA Euro 2020 players